David Walker (February 19, 1806 – September 30, 1879) was an American lawyer, politician, and judge and notable early settler of Fayetteville, Arkansas. Walker served on the Arkansas Supreme Court for a total of eight years, including two years as chief justice.

Early life and career
Walker was born near Elkton, Kentucky on February 19, 1806 to Jacob Wythe Walker and Nancy Hawkins Walker, members of a prominent family in the Southern United States. He grew up with little formal schooling and read law by himself. In 1830, Walker moved to Arkansas, where he was examined to become a lawyer by Ben Johnson and Edward Cross before moving to Fayetteville, Arkansas, a small settlement in northwestern Arkansas.

He became active in Whig politics and was elected to a two-year term as prosecuting attorney for the Third Circuit Court of Arkansas Territory beginning September 13, 1833. He was re-elected in 1834, but resigned following election to the 9th Arkansas Territorial General Assembly. Walker was elected to the state constitutional convention which authored the 1836 Arkansas Constitution. Having become one of the most wealthy citizens in the region, in addition to his law practice, Walker raised cattle and grew grains and fruit on a  farm on the West Fork of the White River with twenty-three slaves.

Secession Convention

Following the election of Abraham Lincoln and subsequent South Carolina Declaration of Secession, secession became an important issue in Arkansas. Voters approved convening a Secession Convention to discuss the matter; Walker was nominated as a unionist delegate to the meeting. Upon convening on March 5, 1861, the slim unionist majority elected Walker as president of the body by a 40-35 vote. Walker and other northwestern Arkansas unionists lodged together in Little Rock and strategized together in the evenings to resist the calls for secession by the southeast Arkansas delegates. Ultimately, the convention decided to put the question of secession to the voters, setting an election for August 5, 1861, and adjourned subject to recall by the president of the convention. After Confederate guns fired on Fort Sumter and President Lincoln issued a call for support from the states, many advocated for recalling the convention, but others were opposed. Convention President Walker issued a proclamation calling for the convention to reconvene on May 6 where, in the final vote, the delegates approved the Arkansas Ordinance of Secession in a vote of 69 to 1.  Some Unionists still wanted a vote of the people on the issue of secession, but that was rejected by a 55–15 margin by the convention.

See also
Archibald Yell
Lafayette Gregg

References

 
 

1806 births
1879 deaths
19th-century judges
American judges
Arkansas lawyers
Arkansas Whigs
Arkansas Democrats
Arkansas state senators
People from Fayetteville, Arkansas
Justices of the Arkansas Supreme Court
Political office-holders in the Confederate States of America
Secession crisis of 1860–61
District attorneys in Arkansas
American slave owners
People from Todd County, Kentucky